There are several lakes named Mud Lake within the U.S. state of Alaska.
 Tern Lake, also known as Mud Lake, Kenai Peninsula Borough, Alaska. 
 Flat Horn Lake, also known as Mud Lake, Matanuska-Susitna Borough, Alaska. 
 Mirror Lake, also known as Mud Lake, Matanuska-Susitna Borough, Alaska. 
 Mud Lake, Matanuska-Susitna Borough, Alaska. 
 Mud Lake, Matanuska-Susitna Borough, Alaska. 
 Mud Lake, Matanuska-Susitna Borough, Alaska. 
 Mud Lake, Matanuska-Susitna Borough, Alaska. 
 Mud Lake, Valdez-Cordova Census Area, Alaska. 
 Mud Lake, Yukon-Koyukuk Census Area, Alaska. 
 Mud Lake, Yukon-Koyukuk Census Area, Alaska.

References
 USGS-U.S. Board on Geographic Names

Lakes of Alaska